Khezerlu-ye Sofla may refer to:
 Khezerlu-ye Sofla, Chaldoran
 Khezerlu-ye Sofla, Showt